This is a list of the 32 official cities in Kyrgyzstan. In addition, there are 12 smaller urban-type settlements in Kyrgyzstan.

List 

There are three types of cities:
cities of republican significance
cities of regional significance
cities of district significance

Gallery

References

External links
Association of cities of Kyrgyz Republic

Kyrgyzstan, List of cities in
 
Cities